Hypsibius marcelli is a species of tardigrade in the class Eutardigrada.  The species from described from brackish water on Tierra del Fuego.  The species also has a disjunct Gondwanan distribution, reported from New Zealand.

References 

Hypsibiidae
Animals described in 1990